Merseyside (West) was a regional league for teams from the Merseyside area which ranked at tier 8 of the English rugby union system. The league had replaced South Lancs/Cheshire 2 and South Lancs/Cheshire 3.  The league was contested for just one season and the following season South Lancs/Cheshire divisions 2 and 3 were restored.

Participating Clubs 2015-16

Merseyside (West) Honours

Notes

References

See also
 Cheshire (South)
 Lancashire (North)
 English Rugby Union Leagues
 English rugby union system
 Rugby union in England

Merseyside West
Sport in Merseyside